Ghadirzir (also Romanized as Ghadīrzīr) is a village in Nakhlestan Rural District, in the Central District of Kahnuj County, Kerman Province, Iran. At the 2006 census, its population was 20, in 4 families.

References 

Populated places in Kahnuj County